Hussein Dey was the last ruler of Ottoman Algeria.

Hussein Dey may also refer to:

 Hussein Dey District, a district in Algeria
 Hussein Dey (commune), a suburb of Algiers
 NA Hussein Dey, a football club